The British Tomato Growers' Association is an organisation based in West Sussex that represents tomato growers in the UK.

Structure
The UK is only 18% self-sufficient in tomatoes. The organisation represents over 90% of tomato growers in the UK (around 850). The British Tomato Season runs from March to October. The Chairman is Nigel Bartle, who is the Manager of Cornerways Nursery in Stoke Ferry, Norfolk. It has the largest tomato-growing glasshouse in the UK.

Events
British Tomato Week takes place in May.

External links
 BTGA

Organisations based in West Sussex
Tomatoes
Horticultural organisations based in the United Kingdom
Organizations established in 1997
1997 establishments in the United Kingdom